Eudonia vallesialis is a species of moth in the family Crambidae. It is found in France, Switzerland, Austria, Italy, Germany, Poland, Slovakia, Hungary, Croatia and Romania.

References

Moths described in 1832
Eudonia
Moths of Europe